was a town located in Nishikunisaki District, Ōita Prefecture, Japan.

As of 2003, the town had an estimated population of 3,604 and a density of 95.62 persons per km2. The total area was 37.69 km2.

On March 31, 2005, Kakaji, along with the town of Matama (also from Nishikunisaki District), was merged into the expanded city of Bungotakada.

Dissolved municipalities of Ōita Prefecture